Stephenville High School is one of two high schools serving northern Bay St. George and Port au Port, Newfoundland and Labrador, Canada. More specifically, the school serves grade 9-12 students from Stephenville, Stephenville Crossing, Noel's Pond, Cold Brook, Kippens, Romaines, Port-au-Port East, Port-au-Port West, Point au Mal and Fox Island River.

Athletics 
The school has been named 4A School of the Year for Newfoundland and Labrador in each of the last 4 years, as well as 5 of the last 6.

Teams include:

Boys Ice Hockey,
Girls Ice Hockey,
Boys Ball Hockey,
Girls Ball Hockey,
Senior Boys Basketball,
Junior Boys Basketball,
Girls Basketball,
Girls Volleyball,
Boys Volleyball,
Track & Field,
Boys Softball,
Girls Softball,
Badminton,
Wrestling,
Table Tennis,
Boys Broomball,
Girls Broomball,
Curling,
Boys Soccer,
And Girls Soccer.
Stephenville High's teams go by the name of Spartans, which was carried over from the former St. Stephen's High.

School groups 

Stephenville High School has a number of active clubs and groups. In the fall of 2007, the school held its first annual Fall Fair.

Groups/Clubs:

Student Council,
Newspaper,
Drama,
French Club,
Science Club,
Humanitarian Club,
Debate Club

The school also has a number of musical groups including Concert Band, Jazz Band, and House Band.

District 

Stephenville High School is part of the Newfoundland and Labrador English School District.

External links 
 Stephenville High
 Profile Page at NLESD Website

High schools in Newfoundland and Labrador
Stephenville, Newfoundland and Labrador
1998 establishments in Canada
Educational institutions established in 1998